Tekeli is a Turkish word derived from teke ("male goat"), and means "having or possessing goats; goaty". It may refer to

Literature
Tekeli (play), a play about the life of Hungarian nobleman Imre Thököly, written by Theodore Hook
Tekeli-li, a cry of terror in Edgar Allan Poe's novel The Narrative of Arthur Gordon Pym of Nantucket
Tekeli-li, a cry borrowed from Poe, in H. P. Lovecraft's novella At the Mountains of Madness

People
 Tekeli (surname)

Places
Tekeli, Kazakhstan, a town in Karasay District
Tekeli, Bozyazı, a town in Bozyazı district, Mersin Province, Turkey
Tekeli, İzmir, a settlement in Menderes, İzmir, Turkey 
Tekeli, Koçarlı, a village in Aydın Province, Turkey
Tekeli, Mut, a village in Mut district, Mersin Province
Tekeli, Oltu

Other uses
Tekeli Mehmet Pasha Mosque, a mosque in Antalya, Turkey
Tekeli (dance), a popular dance in early 19th-century Britain